Rohde & Schwarz GmbH & Co KG  is an international electronics group specializing in the fields of electronic test equipment, broadcast & media, cybersecurity, radiomonitoring and radiolocation, and radiocommunication. The company provides products for the wireless communications, broadcast & media, cybersecurity and electronics industry, aerospace and defense, homeland security and critical infrastructures.

In addition to the Munich headquarters, there are regional headquarters in the United States (Columbia, Maryland) and in Asia (Singapore). About 7,700  of the company's employees work in Germany. Worldwide the company has a total of around 13,000 employees  in over 70 countries. Exports account for around 85 percent of revenues.

History 
The company was founded by Lothar Rohde and Hermann Schwarz who met while studying physics in Jena. They built their first T&M instrument in 1932, and in August 1933, the Physikalisch-Technisches Entwicklungslabor Dr. Rohde & Dr. Schwarz (known as PTE) started in business.
 
 1932: The engineers Dr. Lothar Rohde and Dr. Hermann Schwarz develop the first measuring instrument for the Hermsdorf-Schomburg-Isolatoren-Gesellschaft (Hescho). 
 1933: In summer 1933, the company is founded in an apartment at Thierschstrasse 36 in Munich to set up an electrotechnical lab. On November 17, the "Physikalisch-Technisches Entwicklungslabor Dr. L. Rohde und Dr. H. Schwarz" (PTE) is registered at the Registration Court in Munich. 
 1934: The first export order: A British manufacturer of insulating materials orders a dissipation factor meter (50 MHz to 200 MHz) to measure dielectric losses on ceramic disks up to 100 MHz. 
 1937: Company relocation to a former bread factory on Tassiloplatz, not far from Munich's Ostbahnhof railway station. Rohde & Schwarz has 35 employees and 24 different products in its portfolio. 
 1938: Development of the world's first portable crystal clock (weighing 36 kg). 
 1941: Setup of an independent production site in Bavaria's Allgäu region. Messgerätebau GmbH (today Rohde & Schwarz Messgerätebau GmbH) is founded. Production in the new manufacturing facility begins in Kempten in 1943 and moves to Memmingen in 1944. 
 1942: The first large order of radio monitoring receivers marks the transition to factory-scale production. 
 1945: Rohde & Schwarz receives a large order from the US Army to check, calibrate and repair all radio equipment at the central United States Air Force depot in Erding. 
 1945: Physikalisch-Technisches Entwicklungslabor Dr. L. Rohde & Dr. H. Schwarz (PTE) is renamed Rohde & Schwarz. 
 1949: On January 18, 1949, Rohde & Schwarz receives an order from Radio Munich, the predecessor to the Bavarian Broadcasting Corporation, to build and trial a frequency-modulated VHF test transmitter. 
 1950: Rohde & Schwarz develops the Zg diagraph, the first complex network analyzer for vector network analysis. 
 1955: Development of the NAP1, the first automatic direction finder. It is used in air traffic control to supplement radar. 
 1956: Today's company headquarters is established on Mühldorfstrasse. 
 1959: Presentation of the NP4, the first direction finder to use the Doppler effect. 
 1964: First air traffic noise monitoring system in Germany for Frankfurt Airport.
 1967: Europe's first automatic test system for integrated circuits (IC). 
 1969: New production site established in Teisnach. 
 1970: Shift in sales strategy to focus on export. The company now develops products based on its own specifications and offers them to customers worldwide. 
 1974: First microprocessor-controlled radio tester (SMPU).
 1982: The ALIS GP 853 communications processor automates the process of setting up radio links. In 1994, Rohde & Schwarz puts the then-largest civilian HF communications network into operation in Mexico. 
 1988: Introduction of computer-controlled manufacturing in Memmingen and focus on just-in-time production and an automatic material flow system.
 1995: The world's largest DAB broadcasting network. As a member of the EUREKA 147 DAB project, Rohde & Schwarz developed a field-strength test receiver specially modified for Digital Audio Broadcasting, and a DAB transmitter. 
 1998: First nationwide DVB-T project. Castle Transmission International (CTI) of the United Kingdom orders DVB-T transmitter systems with output power between 500 W and 5 kW. 
 1998: For the voice and data communications needs of the first TETRA project in Germany, the German armed forces use the ACCESSNET®-T system, comprising 42 TETRA RF carriers at seven locations and terminals for 2500 users. 
 1999: R&S®M3xR family – first software defined radios
 2001: New production site in Vimperk, South Bohemia. Rohde & Schwarz acquires a production facility in Vimperk from Tesla Prag a.s. The plant, which today offers 42,000 square meters of floor space, has been carrying out production for Rohde & Schwarz since 1991. All 200 employees are taken over. 
 2001: Rohde & Schwarz SIT GmbH presents the TopSec GSM, a tap-proof mobile phone. 
 2002: Encryption for military and government authorities. The ELCRODAT 6-2, developed by Rohde & Schwarz SIT GmbH, is a crypto system approved by the German Federal Office for Information Security for use at the "top secret" and "cosmic top secret" security levels. 
 2005: Rohde & Schwarz takes over Hameg, a German company that develops and manufactures measuring instruments. 
 2007: The R&S®Nx8600 liquid-cooled high-power transmitters are the most energy-efficient transmitters available to date. 
 2007: The R&S®FSU67 is the world's first spectrum analyzer with a continuous frequency range up to 67 GHz. 
 2007: Rohde & Schwarz takes over Arpège SAS. The company is headquartered in Aubagne, France, near Marseilles. 
 2008: The new R&S®ESMD wideband monitoring receiver combines all radio monitoring functions in a single unit: reception, direction finding, measurement and demodulation. 
 2008: The R&S PR100 is the first portable receiver for tracing weak or briefly transmitted signals in the frequency range from 9 kHz to 7.5 GHz. 
 2010: In December 2010, Rohde & Schwarz takes over Hanover-based DVS Digital Video Systems AG. 
 2010: Rohde & Schwarz acquires a majority interest in the Romanian company Topex, a manufacturer of telecommunications equipment for government authorities and companies. 
 2011: On May 11, 2011, Rohde & Schwarz acquires ipoque GmbH, based in Leipzig. 
 2012: Rohde & Schwarz integrates Swissqual, a leading provider of systems for measuring and assessing the quality of service (QoS) in wireless networks.
 2014: Gateprotect to become part of the Rohde & Schwarz group
 2015: Rohde & Schwarz acquires enterprise security specialist Sirrix AG
 2016: Rohde & Schwarz acquires web application firewall specialist Denyall
 2017: Rohde & Schwarz acquired the technology of Motama GmbH.
 2020: Rohde & Schwarz acquired online learning specialist The Technology Academy.
 2021: Rohde & Schwarz acquired Zurich Instruments.

In May 2022, Rohde & Schwarz announced the acquisition of UK based technology training and development company The Technology Academy. The Technology company specialises in web-based training in the fields of radio frequency, wireless and microwave engineering technology.

Plants and subsidiaries 

Rohde & Schwarz has five plants in Europe and Asia. The European plants in Memmingen, Teisnach and Vimperk offer production services for other companies as well. Central R&D is located at company headquarters in Munich, Germany. Most products are manufactured in the Rohde & Schwarz plants in Memmingen (in Bavaria, Germany), Teisnach (in Bavaria, Germany) and Vimperk (Czech Republic). Outside Germany, Rohde & Schwarz has development centers in the United States, Singapore, Korea, China, Denmark, France and United Kingdom. The company has also production facilities in Singapore and Malaysia, which have been up and running since the beginning of 2011 and July 2011, respectively.

Plants
 Rohde & Schwarz Messgerätebau GmbH in Memmingen: the center of competency for complex equipment, it is responsible for electronic module assembly, microelectronics, microwave engineering, final production and manufacture of test systems.
 Rohde & Schwarz Teisnach plant: the center for mechanical and electronic production. It produces housings, shielding parts, antennas, printed boards, micromechanical precision parts, electromechanical custom-made products. As the center of competency for transmitters and systems, the Teisnach plant manufactures and delivers all TV and sound broadcasting transmitters as well as customized radiocommunications systems.
 Vimperk plant: the Czech plant manufactures products such as cable production and assembles all Hameg instruments.
 Singapore and Malaysia plants: Since 2011, Rohde & Schwarz has been operating small-scale plants in Singapore and Malaysia for final assembly and shipping.

Subsidiaries
 Rohde & Schwarz Vertriebs-GmbH (RSV): headquartered in Munich, it is responsible for the sales of Rohde & Schwarz products and complementary OEM brands within Germany. RSV maintains a nationwide sales network in Germany.
 R&S Systems GmbH: provides system services within the Rohde & Schwarz business fields – from system development and integration to delivery, assembly and commissioning of turnkey T&M and communications equipment worldwide. This includes infotainment test systems for automobile production, mobile ATC systems as well as complete electronics workshops for technical service.
 Rohde & Schwarz International Operations GmbH (RSIO): supports the Asia/Pacific and Middle East/Africa sales organization (= Rohde & Schwarz Regional Headquarters Singapore Pte. Ltd.).
 Rohde & Schwarz SIT GmbH: provides solutions for information and communications security that have been approved by the German Federal Office for Information Security (BSI) and NATO/SECAN. The key activities of the company are the development of crypto products and systems as well as consulting and IT security analyses for government authorities, armed forces and industry.
 GEDIS GmbH: develops and implements customized solutions for testing electronic instruments, modules, and submodules, and for the management of test and communications systems. The company addresses government authorities, large system houses, the automobile industry and their suppliers.
 ipoque GmbH: develops network management systems. The products range from bandwidth management and network transparency to network monitoring and deep packet inspection.
 SwissQual AG: develops and sells systems for measuring and assessing voice, data and video quality in wireless networks. SwissQual was founded in 2000 and is based in Zuchwil, Switzerland.
 Arpège SAS: The French Arpège SAS develops and implements customer-specific systems in the areas of satellite monitoring and lawful interception for government security agencies.
 S.C. Rohde & Schwarz Topex S.A.: develops and implements telecommunications equipment for military and civil markets. Rohde & Schwarz Topex develops voice communications systems for air traffic control, solutions for next generation networks (NGNs), including softswitches, media gateways for TDM, VoIP, GSM and CDMA (2G, 3G), signaling gateways (SS7, ISDN, R2, SIP and H323), broadband Wi-Fi mobile routers and fixed-mobile terminals (2G, 3G).
 The U.S. subsidiary of Rohde & Schwarz was headed up in 1974 by Lothar Rohde's son, Ulrich Rohde. Rohde & Schwarz USA, Inc. was incorporated in the United States in 1978.

Product areas

T&M equipment
Rohde & Schwarz provides T&M solutions for all mobile radio and wireless technologies, from 6G, 5G, LTE, UMTS/HSPA(+), GSM and CDMA2000 to Bluetooth, GPS and wireless internet access via WLAN and WiMAXTM.

The company offers products needed in the development and manufacturing of chipsets, mobile devices and base stations, as well as network operations. Rohde & Schwarz developed signal generators and analyzers for the specific requirements of 5G and LTE-Advanced.

For the aerospace and defense industry, Rohde & Schwarz develops Electronic test equipment for microwave links as well as for radar and satellite communications systems. In addition, the company provides complete systems for EMC and field strength testing, for example to detect electromagnetic disturbance in automotive electronics.

In 2010, Rohde & Schwarz launched the world's first oscilloscope with a digital trigger.

Broadcasting 
The company has been active in TV and sound broadcasting. Rohde & Schwarz transmitters and T&M equipment are in use for analog and digital television. Rohde & Schwarz supports the world's most common digital broadcasting standards. The company offers equipment for ATSC Mobile DTV in North America, ISDB-T in Asia and Latin America and DVB-T2 in Europe. In 2018 Rohde & Schwarz transmitters were installed on One World Trade Center in New York City.

In the field of mobile TV, Rohde & Schwarz sells T&M equipment for the installation, maintenance and monitoring of broadcasting networks. It also supplies consumer electronics manufacturers with the T&M equipment they need for the development and production of satellite receivers and TV sets, including for HD and 3D formats.

At the end of 2010, Rohde & Schwarz acquired DVS Digital Video Systems GmbH which was fully integrated in 2016 and ceased existing. In May 2017, Rohde & Schwarz acquired the technology of Motama GmbH., which expands the company's product portfolio for interruption-free transmission of audio and video content in IP networks. Furthermore in November 2018, Pixel Power Ltd. was acquired to enhance television branding, graphics, automation, master control and playout. Thus the portfolio now includes solutions for the entire transmission chain for audiovisual content – from camera output and terrestrial broadcasting to transmission via satellites and IP networks.

Networks and Cybersecurity 
This business field offers secure WAN, LAN and WLAN network infrastructure components and products to protect data transmission, devices and applications.

Secure communications 
Rohde & Schwarz supplies interoperable radiocommunications systems for military, government and civil applications. It also worked on the development of software defined radio (SDR). At the end of 2008 the German armed forces commissioned the company to develop an SDR base unit for their future joint radio system (SVFuA).

More than 200 airports deploy Rohde & Schwarz radiocommunications systems. In 2011, the company began selling voice communications systems for air traffic control (ATC). These systems are based on a product from Topex SA, a company in which Rohde & Schwarz acquired a majority interest in 2010.

Rohde & Schwarz SIT GmbH develops crypto products and systems for government agencies, the German armed forces, authorities, the military and private industry. The subsidiary's high-security encryption technology is used for both wireless and wireline communications. As early as 2001, Rohde & Schwarz SIT launched the world's first crypto phone TopSec GSM.

Frequency management and radiolocation for security 
Rohde & Schwarz develops stationary and mobile systems for detecting, locating and analyzing radiocommunications signals. Rohde & Schwarz provides authorities and services with solutions for identifying and locating suspicious communications activities. The company sells products such as receivers, direction finders, signal analyzers and antennas, as well as customized systems.

Satellite monitoring also plays an important role at Rohde & Schwarz. Solutions include both stationary and mobile systems enabling government agencies worldwide to intercept satellite-based voice and data communications. In this field, Rohde & Schwarz is supported by its French subsidiary Arpège SAS.

In 2011, Rohde & Schwarz acquired ipoque GmbH, which develops software solutions used to detect and monitor network applications online.

Electronic Warfare 
Rohde & Schwarz developed a detection system called ADRONIS which monitors UAVs and features a direction finding function. The technology can be used to interrupt the control signal and prevent drones carrying out manoeuvres. The R&S "Guardion" Anti UAV-System is based on the "Adronis" System but provides a Diehl Defence developed electromagnetic countermeasure capability. GUARDION operates against drones in stationary, mobile or deployable configurations by detecting the Uplink-signals and Downlink-Signals of the UAV at 433 MHz, 2,4 GHz and 5,8 GHz. The system is backed by a library of Drone-Controllsignals to classify any UAV.

Service, support and system integration 
Rohde & Schwarz has a service and sales network.

R&S Systems GmbH develops and integrates turnkey systems within the Rohde & Schwarz business fields and puts them into operation at customer premises. The system portfolio includes infotainment test systems for automobile production, mobile ATC systems as well as complete electronics workshops for technical service. R&S Systems also offers customized solutions in addition to standard products.

Gedis GmbH is another Rohde & Schwarz system house. This subsidiary specializes in automatic test equipment (ATE) for testing electronic assemblies and modules. Its product portfolio ranges from compact manual test systems to turnkey, automatic in-line systems.

Products 
 Test and measurement
 Spectrum analyzer
 Signal generators
 Network analyzers
 Oscilloscope
 Analog and Digital Audio and TV Broadcast Transmitters
 Professional radio systems
 Secure Communication
 Radiomonitoring
 Radiolocation systems
 Full security scanners
 Software for technical documentations (S1000D, BESTD, IETD)

References

External links 

 The company website
 Prof. Dr. Ulrich L. Rohde at BTU Cottbus-Senftenberg
 Oscilloscopes by Rohde & Schwarz
 Rohde& Schwarz History (from Funding Universe)
 Microwave Journal Article on Rohde & Schwarz
 ipoque company website
 Topex company website
 Rohde & Schwarz Cybersecurity company website

Avionics companies
Electronic test equipment manufacturers
Electronics companies established in 1933
German brands
Manufacturing companies based in Munich
Privately held companies of Germany
Trunked radio systems
German companies established in 1933